The Wishaw Press is a Scottish newspaper that covers Wishaw and the surrounding towns and villages in North Lanarkshire, such as Motherwell, Newmains and Carluke. The paper is owned by Reach plc, and is printed weekly at its office in Airdrie.

References 

Wishaw
Newspapers published in Scotland
North Lanarkshire
Newspapers published by Reach plc